The Johannes Gutenberg University Mainz is a public research university in Mainz, Rhineland Palatinate, Germany, named after the printer Johannes Gutenberg since 1946. With approximately 32,000 students (2018) in about 100 schools and clinics, it is among the largest universities in Germany. Starting on 1 January 2005 the university was reorganized into 11 faculties of study.

The university is a member of the German U15, a coalition of fifteen major research-intensive and leading medical universities in Germany. The Johannes Gutenberg University is considered one of the top universities in Germany.

The university is part of the IT-Cluster Rhine-Main-Neckar. The Johannes Gutenberg University Mainz, the Goethe University Frankfurt and the Technische Universität Darmstadt together form the Rhine-Main-Universities (RMU).

History 
The first University of Mainz goes back to the Archbishop of Mainz, Prince-elector and Reichserzkanzler Adolf II von Nassau. At the time, establishing a university required papal approval and Adolf II initiated the approval process during his time in office. The university, however, was first opened in 1477 by Adolf's successor to the bishopric, Diether von Isenburg. In 1784 the university was opened up for Protestants and Jews (curator  ). It became one of the largest Catholic universities in Europe with ten chairs in theology alone. In the confusion after the establishment of the Mainz Republic of 1792 and its subsequent recapture by the Prussians, academic activity came to a gradual standstill. In 1798 the university became active again under French governance, and lectures in the department of medicine took place until 1823. Only the faculty of theology continued teaching during the 19th century, albeit as a theological seminary (since 1877 "College of Philosophy and Theology").

The current Johannes Gutenberg University Mainz was founded in 1946 by the French occupying power. In a decree on 1 March the French military government implied that the University of Mainz would continue to exist: the university shall be "enabled to resume its function". The remains of anti-aircraft warfare barracks erected in 1938 after the remilitarization of the Rhineland during the Third Reich served as the university's first buildings and are still in use today.

The continuation of academic activity between the old university and Johannes Gutenberg University Mainz, in spite of an interruption spanning over 100 years, is contested. During the time up to its reopening only a seminary and midwifery college survived.

In 1972, the effect of the 1968 student protests began to take a toll on the university's structure. The departments (Fakultäten) were dismantled and the university was organized into broad fields of study (Fachbereiche). Finally in 1974 Peter Schneider was elected as the first president of what was now a "constituted group-university" institute of higher education. In 1990 Jürgen Zöllner became university president yet spent only a year in the position after he was appointed Minister for "Science and Advanced Education" for the State of Rhineland-Palatinate. As the coordinator for the SPD's higher education policy, this furloughed professor from the Institute for Physiological Chemistry played a decisive role in the SPD's higher education policy and in the development of Study Accounts.

Faculties 
The Johannes Gutenberg University Mainz is divided in ten faculties since 1 September 2010.

 Faculty of Catholic Theology
 Faculty of Protestant Theology
 Faculty of Social Sciences, Media, and Sports
 Faculty of Law, Management, and Economics
 University Medicine
 Faculty of Philosophy and Philology
 Faculty of Translation Studies, Linguistics, and Cultural Studies
 Faculty of History and Cultural Studies
 Faculty of Physics, Mathematics, and Computer Science
 Faculty of Chemistry, Pharmacy and Geosciences
 Faculty of Biology

Campus 
The University of Mainz is one of few campus universities in Germany. Nearly all its institutions and facilities are located on the site of a former barracks in the south west part of the city. The university medical centre is located off campus, as is the Department of Applied Linguistics and Cultural Sciences, which was integrated with the university in 1949 and is located in Germersheim. On campus next to the university is the Max Planck Institute for Chemistry, the Max Planck Institute for Polymer Research, the Institute of Molecular Biology, the electron accelerator MAMI, the research reactor TRIGA, the botanical garden, a sports stadium and an indoor swimming pool. Mainz Academy of Arts (Kunsthochschule Mainz) is located off campus.

Academic profile 
The range of studies is comprehensive; the university lacks some technical studies, veterinary medicine and nutrition science. One can nonetheless study the theology, history of books, athletics, music, visual arts, theatre, and film.

Today the Johannes Gutenberg University Mainz has approximately 36,000 students and consists of over 150 institutions and clinics. The university offers international programs, such as the award-winning choir EuropaChorAkademie, founded by Joshard Daus in 1997, in collaboration with the University of the Arts Bremen.

One of the instruments carried by the Mars Exploration Rovers Spirit and Opportunity, a miniature Mössbauer spectrometer, was developed at the university.

The University of Mainz does not currently levy fees or tuition (Studiengebühren) for a regular course of study. Senior citizen students, auditing students, and certain postgraduate students may be subject to fees.

Rankings

It is ranked in the top 300 universities worldwide by the Academic Ranking of World Universities 2017 and Times Higher Education World University Rankings 2017.

According to the report of the German Research Foundation (DFG) from 2018, the University of Mainz is one of the best universities in natural sciences in Germany. In the period under review from 2014 to 2016, the University of Mainz received the highest number of competitive grants in the natural sciences. The university also achieved the first place in physics. In a competitive selection process, the DFG selects the best research projects from researchers at universities and research institutes and finances them. The ranking is thus regarded as an indicator of the quality of research.

Notable people

Old University 
Johann Joachim Becher, physician, professor of medicine 1663–1664
Johann Friedrich von Pfeiffer, economist, professor of cameral science 1784–1787
Andreas Joseph Hofmann, professor of law 1784–1793, president of the first democratically elected parliament in Germany
Samuel Thomas von Sömmerring, professor of anatomy and physiology 1784–1797
Georg Forster, naturalist and world traveller, university librarian 1788–1793

Professors (post 1946) 
Karl-Otto Apel (philosophy)
Kai Arzheimer (political science)
Thomas Bierschenk (ethnology and sociology)
Herbert Braun (theology)
Hauke Brunkhorst (education)
Micha Brumlik (education)
Paul J. Crutzen (chemistry, Nobel Prize 1995)
Fritz Strassmann (physics)
Jürgen Falter (political science)
Hans Galinsky (American studies)
Alfred Kröner (geology)
Karl Cardinal Lehmann (theology)
Thomas Metzinger (philosophy)
Gottfried Münzenberg (physics)
Elisabeth Noelle-Neumann (communication studies)
W. Pannenberg (theology)
Rolf Peffekoven (economics)
Klaus Rose (economics)
Dorothee Sölle (theology)
Beatrice Weder di Mauro (economics)
Isabel Schnabel (economics)
Werner Weidenfeld (political science, former adviser of German chancellor Helmut Kohl)
Jürgen Gauß (theoretical chemistry)
Uğur Şahin (medicine)
Özlem Türeci (medicine)

Alumni 
Alumni of the old University include theologian Friedrich Spee as well as Austrian diplomat Klemens von Metternich, who studied law from 1790 to 1792, and revolutionary Adam Lux.

Among notable alumni from the post-1946 University of Mainz are German politicians Malu Dreyer (SPD, Minister President of Rhineland-Palatinate); Rainer Brüderle (FDP, Federal Minister for Economics and Technology); Horst Teltschik (former security advisor to Chancellor Helmut Kohl and president of the Munich Conference on Security Policy); Kristina Schröder, Federal Minister of Family and Social Affairs; Franz Josef Jung (CDU, Former Federal Minister of Labor and Social Affairs and former Federal Minister of Defence); Jens Beutel, Oberbürgermeister (mayor) of Mainz; particle physicist Vera Lüth; nuclear and particle physicist Johanna Stachel; sculptor Karlheinz Oswald; sports journalist Béla Réthy; political journalist Peter Scholl-Latour; Dieter Stolte, former director-general of ZDF; soprano Elisabeth Scholl; a founder of American avant-garde cinema Jonas Mekas; his brother Adolfas Mekas, film director, writer and educator; mural artist Rainer Maria Latzke; the German climatologist Wolfgang Seiler; Abbas Zaryab, notable Iranian scholar and historian; Indonesian Toraja Church pastor and politician, Ishak Pamumbu Lambe; Srinivas Kishanrao Saidapur, an Indian reproductive biologist; American educator Biddy Martin; Stanisław Potrzebowski, one of leaders of the ridnovir movement in Poland; German opera singer Christine Esterházy; and Ruth Katharina Martha Pfau, nun, physician and writer who devoted more than 50 years of her life to fighting leprosy in Pakistan.

See also 
 List of medieval universities
 List of universities in Germany

References

External links 
 

 
University of Mainz
University of Mainz
Educational institutions established in the 15th century
Johannes Gutenberg
Educational institutions established in 1946
1946 establishments in Germany
Universities and colleges in Rhineland-Palatinate